Dmitri Petrovich Pozhidaev (1913 – 1989) was a Soviet diplomat who served as ambassador to Egypt during the Six-Day War in 1967.  According to one work on the Six-Day War, Pozhidaev was believed by officials in the United States to have "contributed to the rising tensions", with one official referring to him as "one big trouble-maker". In August 1967, shortly after the Six Day War, he was removed as ambassador to Egypt and transferred to an unspecified post.

As Soviet archives for the period remain closed the details of his role are not clear.

References

1913 births
1989 deaths
Ambassadors of the Soviet Union to Burundi
Ambassadors of the Soviet Union to Egypt
Ambassadors of the Soviet Union to Morocco
Ambassadors of the Soviet Union to Switzerland